This is a list of primary schools in Singapore. Children typically start their primary education in the year they turn seven. Primary education lasts six years, and is compulsory for all Singapore citizens.

Primary schools in Singapore are classified as Government or Government-aided schools. Primary schools are typically mixed-sex, though there are a number of single-sex schools. Some primary schools are affiliated with a secondary school, and such schools may have a lower requirement for students from the primary section to enter the affiliated secondary school. At the end of the six years in primary school, students sit for the PSLE examination. Some primary schools are designated as Special Assistance Plan schools by the Ministry of Education. These schools place a special emphasis on the learning of the Chinese language and culture.

See also

 List of secondary schools in Singapore

References

External links
 School Information Service

 
Primary schools in Singapore
Singapore